Kerry David Morgan (born 31 October 1988) is a Welsh footballer who plays as an attacking winger for  Merthyr Town.

Career
Morgan was born in Merthyr Tydfil, but came through the youth ranks at Swansea City. After signing his first professional deal in 2007, he was loaned out to Welsh Premier League neighbours Port Talbot Town, following a short spell in Sweden with the Swans' sister club Östersunds FK. He made a goalscoring debut for the Steelmen in the 5–1 win against Newtown on 25 August and in total went on to score nine goals in 15 league, League Cup and FAW Premier Cup appearances.

Morgan remained at Port Talbot until the New Year before being re-called by the Swans but on 3 January 2008 he was loaned out to Spanish Tercera División team CF Balaguer along with team-mate Chad Bond. His time in Catalonia with Swansea manager Roberto Martínez's former side was short and he returned to Swansea.

In March 2008 he was loaned out again, this time to Southern Football League Premier Division side Clevedon Town. Morgan again made a goalscoring debut, this time in the 1–1 draw with Yate Town and went on to make another seven appearances without scoring.

Morgan spent the entire 2007–08 season on loan at Neath Athletic in the Welsh Premier League and made 30 league appearances, scoring seven goals including a double against Prestatyn Town on S4C's featured match.

On 11 August, Morgan made his Swansea City debut in a 3–0 win over Brighton & Hove Albion in the League Cup. This was followed up by EFL Championship appearances in the 2010–11 season.

In October 2009 Morgan joined Newport County on a three-month loan deal. The loan was extended until the end of the 2009–10 season with Newport leading the Conference South table in December 2009 and Morgan went on to make a total of 29 league appearances as Newport were crowned Conference South champions with a record 103 points and promoted to the Conference National. In August 2010 Morgan rejoined Newport County on loan until 1 January 2011 and again on 13 January 2011 he joined Newport on loan until the end of the 2010–11 season. He was released by Swansea City at the end of the 2010–11 season.

In June 2011 he joined Neath.

Following the winding-up of Neath in the summer of 2012, Morgan joined Bath City. After a season with Bath, Morgan joined Southern League side Merthyr Town in June 2013. Morgan was a key part of the side which reached the play-offs in 2013-14 and then winning the league in 2014–15.

In January 2016 Morgan joined Southern League side Mangotsfield United.

Honours
Newport County
Conference South Winner: 1
2009–10

Merthyr Town
Southern League Division One & South West Winner: 1
2014-2015

References

External links

Welsh Premier profile
Kerry Morgan at Aylesbury United

1988 births
Living people
Welsh footballers
Footballers from Merthyr Tydfil
Swansea City A.F.C. players
Clevedon Town F.C. players
Newport County A.F.C. players
English Football League players
Cymru Premier players
National League (English football) players
Neath F.C. players
CF Balaguer footballers
Östersunds FK players
Expatriate footballers in Sweden
Association football wingers
Merthyr Town F.C. players
Cirencester Town F.C. players
Mangotsfield United F.C. players
Bath City F.C. players
Port Talbot Town F.C. players